Greg Kinnear is an American actor, producer and television personality. He was nominated for an Academy Award, Golden Globe Award, and Screen Actors Guild Award for his role in As Good as It Gets (1997). He also received two Primetime Emmy Award nominations.

Kinnear has appeared in many popular films, including Sabrina (1995), You've Got Mail (1998), Nurse Betty (2000), Someone like You (2001), We Were Soldiers, Auto Focus (both 2002), Stuck on You (2003), Robots (2005), Little Miss Sunshine, Invincible (both 2006), Green Zone, The Last Song (both 2010), Heaven Is for Real (2014), Misbehaviour (2020) and television roles, such as Friends, Talk Soup, Modern Family, House of Cards, Rake, and the miniseries The Stand (2020). Kinnear has portrayed John F. Kennedy in The Kennedys (2011), and Joe Biden in Confirmation (2016).

Major associations

Academy Awards

Primetime Emmy Awards

Daytime Emmy Awards

Golden Globe Awards

Screen Actors Guild Awards

Miscellaneous awards

References 

Lists of awards received by American actor